Antônio José de Moraes Souza Filho, commonly known as Zé Filho, (born February 13, 1970 Parnaíba, Piauí) is a Brazilian businessman and politician.  He served as Governor of the state of Piauí from 2014 to 2015 and Vice Governor of Piauí from 2011 until 2014.

Moraes Souza Filho was elected Vice Governor of Piauí in 2010 as the running mate of Governor Wilson Martins. Filho became the 51st Governor of Piauí on April 4, 2014, when Governor Martins resigned to run for the Federal Senate.

In 2014, Moraes Souza Filho ran for a full term in the Piauí gubernatorial election. However, he was defeated in the gubernatorial election by Senator and former Piauí Governor Wellington Dias in the first round on October 5, 2014. Dias won 63.08% of the vote, while Moraes Souza Filho placed second with 33.25%.

References

Governors of Piauí
Vice Governors of Piauí
Members of the Legislative Assembly of Piauí
Mayors of places in Brazil
Brazilian Democratic Movement politicians
Cidadania politicians
Liberal Front Party (Brazil) politicians
Brazilian Social Democracy Party politicians
People from Parnaíba
Living people
1970 births